Platanthera zothecina (synonym Habenaria zothecina, common name - alcove bog orchid) is a perennial plant in the orchid family (Orchidaceae) found in the Colorado Plateau and Canyonlands region of the southwestern United States and is found in the states of Utah, Arizona and Colorado.

Habitat and range
It can be found in moist sites in seeps and hanging gardens.

Description

Growth pattern
Its overall green color makes it inconspicuous among other greenery in its habitats.

Leaves and stems
Leaves are long and narrowly linear to elliptic.

Inflorescence and fruit
It blooms from May to August.

Green or yellowish-green flowers are on stalk of 5-20, with upper sepals closely contacting the petals to form a hood over the style. The lateral (side) sepals are curved.  Petals are triangular and lance-like.  
The lip is yellowish and linear.

References

zothecina
Flora of the United States